Chen Minzhang (December 1931 – 16 March 1999) was a Chinese politician who served as minister of health from 1987 to 1998.

He was an alternate member of the 13th Central Committee of the Chinese Communist Party and a member of the 14th Central Committee of the Chinese Communist Party. He was a member of the Standing Committee of the 9th National People's Congress.

Biography
Chen was born in Shanghai, in December 1931, while his ancestral home in Hangzhou, Zhejiang. He attended Xuhui High School. He became a Catholic near 1949. In 1949, he enrolled at the Medical School of Aurora University and entered Shanghai Jiao Tong University School of Medicine after the adjustment of universities and colleges in 1952. He joined the Chinese Communist Party (CCP) in 1954. He became an assistant after graduation. At the same time, he worked as a physician at St. Marie Hospital (now Ruijin Hospital).

In 1955, he was transferred to Beijing Xiehe Hospital (now Peking Union Medical College Hospital) and participated in the Socialist Education Movement in Shou County, Anhui in 1964. He became vice minister of health in 1984, rising to minister of health in April 1987.

On 16 March 1999, he died from pancreatic cancer in Beijing, at the age of 67.

References

1931 births
1999 deaths
Aurora University (Shanghai) alumni
Shanghai Jiao Tong University alumni
People's Republic of China politicians from Shanghai
Chinese Communist Party politicians from Shanghai
Alternate members of the 13th Central Committee of the Chinese Communist Party
Members of the 14th Central Committee of the Chinese Communist Party
Members of the Standing Committee of the 9th National People's Congress